Inman Armogen Breaux Sr. (October 4, 1908 – November 24, 1967) was an American football player and coach and a college administrator. He was born in 1908 and was the son of music educator Zelia N. Breaux. Breaux played college football at Virginia Union University (1926–1929) and later served as the head football coach at North Carolina A&T University (1932–1939), compiling a record of 28–24–8. At the time of his death, he was serving as a physical education faculty member and financial aid director at Langston University in Langston, Oklahoma.

Head coaching record

References

External links
 

1908 births
1968 deaths
American football quarterbacks
North Carolina A&T Aggies football coaches
Virginia Union Panthers football players
Langston University faculty
Players of American football from St. Louis
African-American coaches of American football
African-American players of American football
20th-century African-American sportspeople